François-Bernard Lépicié (6 October 1698 – 17 January 1755) was an 18th-century French engraver, historiographer and biographer.

Lépicié married Renée-Élisabeth Marlié, who became an engraver under the training of her husband and with whom he had a son, the painter Nicolas-Bernard Lépicié. He died from a stroke.

Gallery

Sources 
 Philippe Le Bas Dictionnaire encyclopédique de la France, vol.10, Paris, Firmin Didot frères, 1843,  (p. 180).
 Louis-Gabriel Michaud, Biographie universelle, ancienne et moderne ou histoire, vol.24, Paris, Mme Desplaces, 1854,  (p. 250).

Further reading

External links 

 François-Bernard Lépicié on Joconde
 François-Bernard Lépicié on data.bnf.fr
 Monument à Mignard

18th-century French engravers
French biographers
French historiographers
Artists from Paris
1698 births
1755 deaths